Donald Melton Babers (born 15 May 1931) is a retired lieutenant general in the United States Army who served as director of the Defense Logistics Agency from 1984 to 1986. He was commissioned in 1954 through the ROTC program at Oklahoma A&M, also having attained a Bachelor of Arts degree in secondary education. He earned an M.B.A. degree from Syracuse University in 1964.

References

1931 births
Living people
People from Guadalupe County, New Mexico
Oklahoma State University alumni
Martin J. Whitman School of Management alumni
United States Army generals